State assembly elections were held in Malaysia on 10 May 1969, alongside general elections.

Results

Johore

Kedah

Kelantan

Malacca

Negri Sembilan

Pahang

Penang

Perak

Perlis

Sarawak

Selangor

Trengganu

References

State elections in Malaysia
State